John Douglas Andrew Lidster (born October 18, 1960) is a Canadian former professional ice hockey defenceman who played in the National Hockey League (NHL). He was an assistant coach for the Vancouver Canucks until the end of the 2016-2017 season.

Lidster was selected by the Vancouver Canucks in the seventh round of the 1980 NHL Entry Draft (133rd overall). Lidster played four years of college hockey for Colorado College before playing for Team Canada in the 1984 Olympics.  He made his NHL debut with the Canucks near the end of the 1983–84 season, and became a reliable presence on the Vancouver blue line until he was traded to the New York Rangers prior to the 1993–94 NHL season. There, he moved into more of a depth role, but still helped guide the 1994 Rangers to their first Stanley Cup in 54 years, scoring two goals in the Finals as they defeated the Canucks.  After a brief stint with the St. Louis Blues, he was reacquired by the Rangers in 1995–96, and played three more seasons on Broadway before signing with the Dallas Stars in early 1999. There he won his second Stanley Cup, before retiring.

Awards and honours

Career statistics

Regular season and playoffs

International

Transactions
June 25, 1993 - Traded by the Vancouver Canucks to the New York Rangers in exchange for John Vanbiesbrouck.
July 24, 1994 - Traded by the New York Rangers, along with Esa Tikkanen, to the St. Louis Blues in exchange for Petr Nedvěd.
July 28, 1995 - Traded by the St. Louis Blues to the New York Rangers in exchange for Jay Wells.
February 26, 1999 - Signed as a free agent with the Dallas Stars.

Coaching
Lidster went into coaching, and served as head coach of the Saginaw Spirit in 2004–05. He served as an assistant coach for the Canadian Women's National Hockey team.  He also coached youth hockey in Plymouth, Michigan. As part of the IIHF Ambassador and Mentor Program, Lidster was a Hockey Canada coaching mentor that travelled to Bratislava, Slovakia to participate in the 2011 IIHF High Performance Women's Camp from July 4–12. In 2012, he was named assistant coach of the Texas Stars. On July 7, 2014, he returned to the Canucks as an assistant coach.

References

External links

Profile at Hockey Draft Central
Coach falls victim to PC era

1960 births
Canadian ice hockey defencemen
Colorado College Tigers men's ice hockey players
Dallas Stars players
Sportspeople from Kamloops
Ice hockey players at the 1984 Winter Olympics
Living people
New York Rangers players
Olympic ice hockey players of Canada
Saginaw Spirit coaches
St. Louis Blues players
Stanley Cup champions
Vancouver Canucks captains
Vancouver Canucks coaches
Vancouver Canucks draft picks
Vancouver Canucks players
Ice hockey people from British Columbia
Canadian ice hockey coaches
AHCA Division I men's ice hockey All-Americans